British Columbia is the westernmost province in Canada, and is prone to fires. Fires are extremely common during summer, and 2017 had the worst fire season on record.

Inclusion criteria and organization 
Only fires with at least 10,000 hectares burned are allowed, unless deaths involved. The fires are organized by date. If there are multiple fires on a certain date, the larger fire goes on top.

1908

2003

2004

2005

2006

2009

2010

2011

2012

2014

2015

2016

2017

2018

2021

2022

See also 

 List of fires in Canada
 2017 British Columbia wildfires
 2018 British Columbia wildfires
 List of wildfires

References 

Natural disasters in British Columbia
Wildfires in Canada
Fires